The sport of football in the country of Cambodia is run by the Cambodian Football Federation.

History

Football was introducted into the country by French settlers.

Domestic

The association administers the national football team as well as the Metfone C-League. Football is the most popular sport in Cambodia, although Sepak takraw (which looks like volleyball), mixed martial arts and wrestling are also popular.

National team
The national team's best performance was at the 1972 AFC Asian Cup where they reached the semi finals, arguably the best generation in Cambodian football history. Later, due to political plague, Cambodia fell of favor and has not regained its power as it used to be.

In recent years, with the influx of money investment from China, Cambodia experienced a new resurgence of their national football team, with the country produced some of the newest names, Chan Vathanaka and Keo Sokpheng being the two most revered players in contemporary Cambodian football. The Cambodian football team also experiences new development under the tutor of manager Keisuke Honda, who have opened a recent football academy in the country.

References

External links
Soccer Highlights